Hit to Death in the Future Head is the fifth studio album by American rock band the Flaming Lips, released on August 11, 1992, by Warner Bros. Records. "Talkin' 'Bout the Smiling Deathporn Immortality Blues (Everyone Wants to Live Forever)" was released as the lead track on the EP Yeah, I Know It's a Drag... But Wastin' Pigs Is Still Radical to promote the album. The title provided the inspiration for the name of the British band the Futureheads.

Recording and release
Recorded in 1991 by the same lineup that had been featured on In a Priest Driven Ambulance, the album's release was delayed for nearly a year due to the use of a sample from Michael Kamen's score for the film Brazil in the track "You Have to Be Joking (Autopsy of the Devil's Brain)", which required a lengthy clearance process. During the intervening period, both Nathan Roberts and Jonathan Donahue left the band (the latter resuming his duties in Mercury Rev).  By the time of the album's release both Steven Drozd and Ronald Jones had joined, and performed on the subsequent tour.

The album is known for a particularly long hidden track at the end of the CD that consists of a continuous burst of staccato noise that pans from channel to channel and lasts for nearly a half-hour.

Reception

From contemporary reviews, Andrew Perry of Select gave Hit to Death in the Future Head a five out of five rating, noting the groups "gorgeously melodic garage pop is rarely short of breathtaking", and compared the band to Mercury Rev, declaring that  if "Yerself Is Steam has seldom left your turntable, this won't either. Magnificent."

From retrospective reviews, AllMusic's Jason Ankeny noted that even though the album's "not as conceptually tight as In a Priest Driven Ambulance", it's "no less cohesive or imaginative", and ultimately concluded that the album "serves as the bridge between the band's noisier, more hallucinatory indie work and the acid-bubblegum aesthetic perfected on their later Warner Bros. albums".

Track listing

Personnel
 Wayne Coyne – vocals, guitar
 Michael Ivins – bass
 Jonathan Donahue – guitar
 Nathan Roberts – drums

References

1992 albums
The Flaming Lips albums
Warner Records albums
Albums produced by Dave Fridmann